Glena furfuraria is a species of geometrid moth in the family Geometridae. It is found in North America.

The MONA or Hodges number for Glena furfuraria is 6446.

Subspecies
These two subspecies belong to the species Glena furfuraria:
 Glena furfuraria furfuraria
 Glena furfuraria minor Sperry, 1952

References

Further reading

 
 

Boarmiini
Articles created by Qbugbot
Moths described in 1888